George Beattie (28 May 1877 – 6 April 1953) was a Canadian sport shooter who competed in the 1908 Summer Olympics, 1920 Summer Olympics and 1924 Summer Olympics.

In the 1908 Olympics, he won a silver medal in the individual and team trap shooting events. Twelve years later at Antwerp Olympics he was fifth in team trap event. He also participated in the individual trap competition but his result is unknown. In 1924 at Paris Olympics he won a silver medal in team trap event and was sixth in individual trap event.

References

External links

1877 births
1953 deaths
Sportspeople from Montreal
Canadian male sport shooters
Olympic shooters of Canada
Shooters at the 1908 Summer Olympics
Shooters at the 1920 Summer Olympics
Shooters at the 1924 Summer Olympics
Olympic silver medalists for Canada
Olympic medalists in shooting
Medalists at the 1908 Summer Olympics
Medalists at the 1924 Summer Olympics
20th-century Canadian people